Li Zhilong (born March 9, 1988, Beijing) is a Chinese 2012 Olympics athlete who competes in the 400 metre hurdles.

See also
China at the 2012 Summer Olympics - Athletics
Athletics at the 2012 Summer Olympics – Men's 400 metres hurdles

References

1988 births
Living people
Chinese male hurdlers
Athletes (track and field) at the 2012 Summer Olympics
Olympic athletes of China
Runners from Beijing